The 1st Parliament of Singapore was a meeting of the Parliament of Singapore. It commenced its first and only session on 8 December 1965 and was dissolved on 8 February 1968.

The members of the 1st Parliament had been elected in the 1963 general election to the 3rd Legislative Assembly of Singapore, which was renamed as the Parliament of Singapore following Singapore's independence in 1965. Parliament was controlled by a People's Action Party majority, led by Prime Minister Lee Kuan Yew and his Cabinet. The Speakers were A P Rajah and Punch Coomaraswamy.

Officeholders 

 Speaker:
 Arumugam Ponnu Rajah, until 5 August 1966
 Punch Coomaraswamy, from 17 August 1966
 Deputy Speaker: Punch Coomaraswamy, until 16 August 1966
 Prime Minister: Lee Kuan Yew (PAP)
 Deputy Prime Minister: Toh Chin Chye (PAP)
 Leader of the Opposition:
 Lim Huan Boon (BS), until 31 December 1965
 Chia Thye Poh (BS), from 1 January 1966 until 7 October 1966
 Leader of the House: Toh Chin Chye (PAP)
 Party Whip of the People's Action Party: Chan Chee Seng

Composition

Members 
This is the list of the members of the 1st Parliament of Singapore on 8 December 1965.

By-elections

References 

Parliament of Singapore